Eric Weissel (1903–1972) was an Australian rugby league footballer,  a state and national representative goal-kicking .  He played his club career in country New South Wales and is considered one of the nation's finest footballers of the 20th century.

Biography and Club career 
Weissel was born in Cootamundra in 1903. He died in 1972.

Weissel played his entire club football career in his home area of the Riverina in southern New South Wales. He rejected offers from Sydney and England clubs, choosing instead to stay in the district he called home, and turned out with five different clubs during an 18-year career: Cootamundra, Temora, Barmedman, Narrandera and Wagga Wagga.  With Cootamundra he was captain during two years when they retained the regional Maher Cup with an unbeaten record. Weissel coached Wagga Magpies to win the Clayton Cup in 1939.

Representative career 
After being selected for New South Wales in 1928, Weissel made his international representative debut against a touring British side that same year, featuring in two Tests. He made the Australian squad for the 1929–30 Kangaroo tour of Great Britain, playing in three Tests and 17 tour matches. He topped the tour scoring tally with five tries and fifty-six goals on the tour. In the First Test at Hull, Weissel featured in the 31-8 Australian victory scoring a try and kicking five goals.

He played in all three Tests of the 1932 Domestic Ashes series against Great Britain, including the brutal "Battle of Brisbane" Test.

Cricketer
Sean Fagan's rl1908.com site quotes a Donald Bradman biography which records that Weissel was playing for a Riverina representative side on 22 November 1926 at the Sydney Cricket Ground against a Southern Districts side in which Bradman was making his SCG debut. Weissel dismissed "the Don" for 43.

Accolades
Since 1976 the Eric Weissel medal has been awarded to the best and fairest player of the season in the Riverina regional country rugby league competition.

The Eric Weissel Oval, a 10,000-seat stadium in Wagga Wagga was named in his honour.

In February 2008, Weissel was named in the list of Australia's 100 Greatest Players (1908–2007) which was commissioned by the NRL and ARL to celebrate the code's centenary year in Australia.

See also 
 Eric Weissel Oval

Sources 
 Whiticker, Alan & Hudson, Glen (2006) The Encyclopedia of Rugby League Players, Gavin Allen Publishing, Sydney
 Andrews, Malcolm (2006) The ABC of Rugby League Austn Broadcasting Corpn, Sydney

References 

Australian rugby league players
Australia national rugby league team players
1903 births
1972 deaths
Rugby league five-eighths
Rugby league players from New South Wales